RRCC may refer to:

Schools
 Rainy River Community College (RRCC), International Falls, Minnesota, USA
 Red River Community College (RRCC), Winnipeg, Manitoba, Canada
 Red Rocks Community College (RRCC), Colorado, USA

Other uses
 Roanoke Region Chamber of Commerce (RRCC); see Roanoke Region
 Los Angeles County Registrar-Recorder/County Clerk (RR/CC)

See also
 RC (disambiguation)

 R2C2